Gökhan Tokgöz (born 22 April 1979 in Merzifon, Amasya) is a Turkish footballer who plays as a goalkeeper for Bozüyükspor.

He had played for Gençlerbirliği from 2002 to 2008.

References

1979 births
Turkish footballers
Turkey B international footballers
Süper Lig players
Gençlerbirliği S.K. footballers
Ankaraspor footballers
Kayseri Erciyesspor footballers
Konyaspor footballers
Bozüyükspor footballers
Living people
Turkey under-21 international footballers

Association football goalkeepers
People from Merzifon